The Prague Open is a defunct Grand Prix and ATP affiliated men's tennis tournament played from 1987 to 1999. It was held in Prague in the Czech Republic (formerly Czechoslovakia) and played on outdoor clay courts.

Karel Nováček and Sergi Bruguera were singles title holders as they won two editions each one.
Vojtěch Flégl, Karel Nováček and Daniel Vacek were the doubles title record holders with two victories each one.
Karel Nováček was also a singles and doubles winner in the same year, and so was Yevgeny Kafelnikov.

Results

Singles

Doubles

See also
 I.ČLTK Prague Open

References

External links
 ATP results archive

 
Clay court tennis tournaments
Grand Prix tennis circuit
ATP Tour
Defunct tennis tournaments in the Czech Republic